Topolnoye is a rural locality (a selo) and the administrative center of Topolinsky Selsoviet of Khabarsky District, Altai Krai, Russia. The population was 433 in 2016. It was founded in 1776. There are 11 streets.

Geography 
Topolnoye is located near Topolnoye Lake of the Burla river basin, 54 km west of Khabary (the district's administrative centre) by road. Lesnoye is the nearest rural locality.

References 

Rural localities in Khabarsky District